Ting Kau is an area in west Tsuen Wan District, New Territories, Hong Kong. Ting Kau Village is a village near the shore. Ting Kau is famous for the Ting Kau Bridge, spanning the Rambler Channel, from Ting Kau to Tsing Yi Island.

Administration
Ting Kau is a recognized village under the New Territories Small House Policy.

Beaches

 Approach Beach
 Casam Beach
 Hoi Mei Wan Beach
 Lido Beach
 Ting Kau Beach was once a popular beach in Hong Kong. The water quality affected by the treated water injected into Victoria Harbour.

Private housing
 Golden Villa
 The Westminster Terrace

Education
Ting Kau is in Primary One Admission (POA) School Net 62, which includes schools in Tsuen Wan and areas nearby. The net includes multiple aided schools and one government school, Hoi Pa Street Government Primary School.

Transportation
Castle Peak Road is the main access to the area.

See also
 Airport Core Programme Exhibition Centre

References

External links

 Delineation of area of existing village Ting Kau (Tsuen Wan) for election of resident representative (2019 to 2022)